There have been two baronetcies created for persons with the surname Turton, one in the Baronetage of Great Britain and one in the Baronetage of the United Kingdom. Both creations are extinct.

The Turton Baronetcy, of Starborough Castle in the County of Surrey, was created in the Baronetage of Great Britain on 13 May 1796 for Thomas Turton, later Member of Parliament for Southwark. The title became extinct on the death of the second Baronet in 1854.

The Turton Baronetcy, of Upsall in the North Riding of the County of York, was created in the Baronetage of the United Kingdom on 2 February 1926 for Edward Turton, Member of Parliament for Thirsk and Malton. The title became extinct on his death in 1929.

Turton baronets, of Starborough Castle, Surrey (1796)

Sir Thomas Turton, 1st Baronet (1764–1844) MP for Southwark 1806–1812
Sir Thomas Edward Michell Turton, 2nd Baronet (1790–1854) Legal Advisor to Lord Durham, British North America 1838

Turton baronets, of Upsall (1926)

Sir Edmund Russborough Turton, 1st Baronet (1857–1929). British Conservative Party politician for Thirsk and Malton 1915–1929

References

Extinct baronetcies in the Baronetage of Great Britain
Extinct baronetcies in the Baronetage of the United Kingdom